Eastbourne Theatres is a council-owned theatre group responsible for three theatres in Eastbourne, England. The group is responsible for the Congress Theatre, Devonshire Park Theatre and the Winter Garden. The theatres together have a combined capacity of more than 4500 and show a variety of touring productions. The group also produces a variety of productions in-house under a separate arm known as Eastbourne Theatres Productions, some of which have gone on to tour both nationally and internationally.

Artistic Directors
2001–present - Chris Jordan

Eastbourne Theatres Productions

2001

Relatively Speaking by Alan Ayckbourn (18 July – 18 August)
You’re Only Young Twice by Ron Aldridge (21 August – 25 September)
Aladdin (13 December 2001 – 6 January 2002)

2002

Taking Steps by Alan Ayckbourn (2 – 25 July)
Stepping Out by Richard Harris (7 August – 14 September)
Jack & The Beanstalk (10 December 2002 – 5 January 2003)

2003

Barnum (4 July – 16 August)
Funny Money by Ray Cooney (28 August – 20 September)
Cinderella (11 December 2003 – 11 January 2004)

2004

Nunsense by Dan Goggin (14 August – 18 September)
Dick Whittington (9 December 2004 – 9 January 2005)

2005

Telstar by James Hicks (28 February – 5 March)
Dames at Sea (12 August – 17 September)
Sleeping Beauty (9 December 2005 – 8 January 2006)

2006

Neville's Island (16 August – 16 September)
Aladdin (15 December 2006 – 14 January 2007)

2007

Solo Season - David Bradley in The Quiz (11 - 17 June)
By Jeeves by Alan Ayckbourn and Andrew Lloyd Webber (16 August – 8 September)
Beauty & the Beast (14 December 2007 - 13 January 2008)

2008

Snow White and the Seven Dwarfs (12 December 2008 - 11 January 2009)

2009

Last of the Summer Wine (15 July 2009 - 8 August 2009)

References

External links
 Eastbourne Theatres website

Eastbourne
Theatres in Eastbourne